John Joseph Ware (1858 – July 1921), sometimes known as "Honest John", was an Australian trade unionist, who became a politician in South Africa.

Born in Australia, Ware became a stonemason and joined the Sydney Operative Masons' Society.  He represented the union at a conference in Sydney which formally established the Australian Labor Party.  In 1897, Ware emigrated to the Transvaal, where he joined the South African Operative Masons' Society.  He also became active in the Witwatersrand Trades and Labour Council, becoming its president in 1906.

On 1 February 1906, Ware won a seat on Johannesburg Town Council, through a by-election for Fordsburg.  He also served as deputy mayor of Johannesburg, and on its school board.  He initially represented the Transvaal Political and Labour League, then later in 1906 was one of the first executive members of the Transvaal Independent Labour Party, but disassociated himself from it in 1907, objecting to its socialism.  One of the most conservative trade union leaders, he argued that only white workers should be permitted to undertake skilled work.

In 1910, Ware was appointed as one of two vice presidents of the newly founded South African Labour Party.  In 1910, he won the Fordsburg seat on the Transvaal Provincial Council.  In 1915, he was appointed to the Senate of South Africa, holding his seat until his death in 1921.

References

1858 births
1921 deaths
Australian emigrants to South Africa
Australian trade unionists
Labour Party (South Africa) politicians
South African trade unionists